Adenilson Martins do Carmo Nascimento (born 9 March 1992), known as Adenilson, is a Brazilian footballer who plays for Cascavel as a midfielder.

Career statistics

References

External links

1992 births
Living people
Brazilian footballers
Brazilian expatriate footballers
Association football midfielders
Campeonato Brasileiro Série C players
Campeonato Brasileiro Série D players
UAE First Division League players
Grêmio Esportivo Osasco players
Osasco Futebol Clube players
Chiangrai United F.C. players
Sumaré Atlético Clube players
Clube Atlético Lemense players
Guarani Esporte Clube (CE) players
FC Atlético Cearense players
Fortaleza Esporte Clube players
Clube do Remo players
América Futebol Clube (RN) players
Al Dhaid SC players
FC Cascavel players
Expatriate footballers in the United Arab Emirates
Brazilian expatriate sportspeople in the United Arab Emirates
Sportspeople from Salvador, Bahia